Achramorphidae is a family of calcareous sponges in the order Leucosolenida.

References 

Leucosolenida
Taxa named by Nicole Boury-Esnault
Taxa named by Jean Vacelet
Animals described in 2002